Pickup is a 1951 American film noir starring Hugo Haas, Beverly Michaels, Allan Nixon and Howland Chamberlain. Written and directed by Haas, a Czech actor and filmmaker, it was his first American film.  Haas, a refugee from German-occupied Europe, went on to make a series of gloomy noirs about doomed middle-aged men led astray by younger femmes fatales. 

The low-budget film was based on a 1926 novel Guard No. 47 by Josef Kopta, and has a plot that is similar to that of the 1946 film The Postman Always Rings Twice (1946).

Plot
Haas plays Jan "Hunky" Horak, a hard-of-hearing railroad dispatcher who lives in a poor neighborhood by the railroad tracks and is seduced by Betty (Michaels), who is after his money. After they marry, Betty and her lover Steve Kowalski (Nixon) scheme to murder him. But in a chance accident, Jan regains his hearing and discovers their plot. Steve has a last-minute change of heart and Betty leaves, disgusted with Steve's inaction.

Cast
 Hugo Haas as Jan Horak
 Beverly Michaels as Betty
 Allan Nixon as Steve
 Howland Chamberlain as Professor
 Jo-Carroll Dennison as Irma 
 Mark Lowell as Waiter 
 Marjorie Beckett as Secretary Doctor 
 Art Lewis as Driver
 Jack Daley as Company Doctor 
 Bernard Gorcey as Joe

Production
The film has been described by Larry Langman as "a poor man's version" of the 1946 film The Postman Always Rings Twice (1946), based on James M Cain's 1934 novel "The Postman Always Rings Twice".

Release
It opened in New York on August 30, 1951.  Released only to secondary and independent theaters upon its 1951 release.

Reception
Time magazine praised Haas as "Hollywood's most promising new moviemaker" since Stanley Kramer, calling the film "a fascinating game of cat & mouse, played for pathos as well as suspense", and noted how its sense of character, acceptance of human frailty, and seedy, impoverished setting made it far from the usual Hollywood film. More recently Filmfanatic.org called it "a tawdry, low-budget camp classic", criticising predictable elements but praising the dialog and some unexpected plot twists. Fernando F. Croce remarked on its "unusually blunt masochism" and sympathetic treatment of the femme fatale (who makes it out alive).

See also
 Guard No. 47 (2008)

References

External links

1951 films
1951 drama films
American drama films
American black-and-white films
Films directed by Hugo Haas
Columbia Pictures films
Film noir
American remakes of foreign films
Films based on Czech novels
1950s English-language films
1950s American films